The Boxers, officially known as the Society of Righteous and Harmonious Fists among other names, were a Chinese secret society based in Northern China that carried out the Boxer Rebellion from 1899 to 1901. The movement was made up of independent local village groups, many of which kept their membership secret, making the total number of participants difficult to estimate, but it may have included as many as 100,000. They originally attacked the Qing government, but soon called upon it to resist foreign influence. In the summer of 1900, groups of Boxer fighters destroyed foreign owned property, such as railroads and telegraphs, murdered Christian missionaries and Chinese Christians. They then supported the Empress Dowager in resisting the resulting foreign invasion, which all but destroyed the group and ended the Rebellion, though some members continued in other groups across China.

Names 

In the English speaking world, the group came to be known as the "Boxers", due to its members' practice of Chinese martial arts, at the time called "Chinese boxing". Though the group had existed since the mid-1880s, it was first reported externally as the "National Righteousness Group" in an 1899 Qing report intent on solving disturbances in the Shandong and Zhili Provinces. This is later clarified in a follow-up report to have been a mistake, and that the actual name is in fact "League of Harmony and Justice", alternatively translated as "Militia United in Righteousness". During 1898, the group was known as the Plum Blossom Fists, though this name would not be used into 1899 and after. In more recent English publications, the name of the group from 1899, variously translated as "Society of Righteous and Harmonious Fists" or "Fists of Harmony and Justice", tends to be used over the yìhétuán-based name. The group is also sometimes known in English by any one of its Chinese names, with more recent publications tending to use Pinyin, and older publications using Wade–Giles or other systems.

Origins 
During the rule of the Qing dynasty, non-state secret societies, such as the Big Swords Society or the White Lotus Society, often exerted significant influence and force. These groups often took advantage, through armed members, of the lack of imperial order in many areas of China, along with rampant corruption that enabled the societies to function even in well-controlled areas.

Yi-he boxing, as it was later practised by the Fists of Harmony and Justice, long predated the movement. In 1779, the Qing government already investigated rumours according to which a man named Yang practised this martial arts style in Guan County, Shandong, though state authorities were unable to confirm this at the time.

Though the Boxer movement would originate in Shandong and Hebei intent on lessening governmental influence throughout China by means of violence, the group would quickly include its directive to attempt to eliminate all foreign influence also, which was considered at the time to have already penetrated the imperial government. The group at this time was deeply associated with other secret societies in their efforts to eliminate Christians, as can be seen in the 4 July 1896 with attacks on German missionaries in the regions of Western Shandong that later were controlled by the Boxers.

The movement first began in these areas in the mid-1880s as various group with similar aims, led by local influences such as Zhang Decheng in Hebei, and Zhu Hongdeng in Shandong, both leading small but devoted groups directly under their personal control. These small groups served as local enforcers of the Boxers' efforts to control the populace, to curtail the influence of both the Qing government and that of foreigners, particularly Christians.

During 1898, the previously separate Boxer groups in Shandong and Hebei would fall under much more direct leadership, with the establishment of structure into the group in the form of ranks. This would also involve the renaming of the group into the "Plum Blossom Fists". However, the name-change was not used past 1898, with the name "Fists of Harmony and Justice" used instead.

On 23 May 1898, an investigation was made by the Guangxu Emperor into disturbances in the Shandong-Zhili border region by a supposed "National Righteousness Group", with the possibility of 10,000 Boxer soldiers being under group command in this region. A representative of the monarchy, Zhang Rumei, would be sent along with an army to put down any unrest in the region. The result of the meeting was not negative, with Zhang reporting that there was no trouble in the region, along with more accurate reports on the group's smaller numbers.

The movement was primarily composed of peasants, to which were added idle youth, ruined artisans and laid-off workers. Some Boxer recruits were disbanded imperial soldiers and local militiamen.

Conflict 

In March 1898, the Boxers started to agitate the population in the streets with the slogan "Uphold the Qing, destroy foreigners!". Their main leader was Cao Futian. Other leaders in Zhili Province were Liu Chengxiang, and Zhang Decheng.

After a battle with the Imperial troops in October 1899, the Boxers focused mainly on missionaries and Christian activities, as they were considered "tainting the purity of the Chinese culture". The Qing government was divided towards how to react to the Boxer's activities. The conservative element of the court was in favour of them. Prince Duan, a fervent supporter of their cause, arranged a meeting between Cao and Empress Dowager Ci Xi. At the meeting, the crown prince even wore a Boxer uniform to show support.

At the beginning of June 1900, about 450 men of the Eight-Nation Alliance arrived in Beijing to protect the foreign legations under siege by the Boxers and Imperial Army, in what was the Siege of the International Legations. The Boxers were at their peak, now supported by some elements of the Imperial Army. They changed their slogan to "Support the Qing, destroy foreigners!".

The Boxers multiplied their murderous actions against foreigners and Chinese Christians. In Beijing, the Boxers were officially placed under command of members of the Court, such as Prince Duan. During the Rebellion, the Boxers, fighting troops of the Eight-Nation Alliance with close combat weapons or even their own hands, were decimated. After the conflict, The Empress Dowager Ci Xi ordered the repression of the remaining Boxers, in an attempt to calm the foreign nations.

In popular culture 
The Boxer Rebellion is depicted in the film 55 Days at Peking, by Nicholas Ray (1963).

The Boxers are portrayed in Boxers and Saints, a comic series by Gene Luen Yang. The main character of Boxers, Lee Bao, becomes a leader of the Boxer Rebellion. 

The Boxer Rebellion is graphically depicted in the Shaw Brothers production of Boxer Rebellion, a 1976 film directed by Chang Cheh. This film was distributed in the United States as The Bloody Avengers by World Northal Corporation in 1980. The Boxers are also featured in the films Legendary Weapons of China (1981) and Shanghai Knights (2003). The  Red Lanterns, an all-female group affiliated to the Boxers, are depicted in the film Once Upon a Time in China IV (1993).

See also 

 Katipunan 
 Boxer Rebellion
 Red Turban Rebellion
 Taiping Heavenly Kingdom
 Red Lanterns (Boxer Uprising)

Notes and references 

Boxer Rebellion
Chinese secret societies
1898 in China
19th-century establishments in China
19th century in China